Katrina Anne Foley (born July 5, 1967) is an American politician and attorney currently serving as the member of the Orange County Board of Supervisors from the 5th district, assuming office as supervisor on March 26, 2021. She is also on the board of the Orange County Transportation Authority.

Prior to her victory in a March 9, 2021 special election, she served as Mayor of Costa Mesa, California, where she became the city's first directly elected mayor in 2018. She previously ran an unsuccessful bid for California's 37th State Senate district, placing 3rd in the 2020 primary election with 24.7% of the vote.

Her victory in a March 9, 2021 special election flip a seat in the Orange County Board of Supervisors, making her the second Democrat on the board, the other being Doug Chaffee. In 2022, when Foley won relection to the board, under new district boundaries, a third Democrat also entered the board, flipping control of the Orange County Board of Supervisors from Republican to Democratic. That marked the first time since 1976 in which Democrats had control of the board.

Early life and education
Foley was born in Bakersfield, California. She received a bachelor's degree in English and Women's Studies from UCLA and a Juris Doctor from Seattle University.

Electoral history

2020 Senate primary

2021 supervisorial special election District 2

2022 supervisorial election District 5

Runoff

Results

References

Women mayors of places in California
Living people
1967 births
21st-century American women